Take That is a British pop band.

Take That may also refer to:

 Take That: For the Record, a TV documentary about the band
 Take That: The Ultimate Tour, a 2006 feature-length video by the band
 "Take That" (Wiley song),  2009
 "Take That" (Torrey Carter song), 2000
 Take That (TV series), a 1950s Australian television series